Johann Vexo (born 1978) is a French organist. He is the organist for both the choir organ at Notre Dame de Paris (as deputy) and the great organ of Nancy Cathedral (as titular).

Biography
Born in Nancy, Johann Vexo first studied organ with Christophe Mantoux, as well as early music and harpsichord at the Conservatory of Strasbourg, where he was awarded Premier Prix in organ. He continued his studies at the Conservatoire National Supérieur de Musique of Paris where his teachers included Michel Bouvard and Olivier Latry for organ, Thierry Escaich and Philippe Lefebvre for improvisation. He earned Premier Prix in both organ and basso continuo and additional prizes in harmony and counterpoint.

At the age  of 25, he was appointed Choir Organist of Notre-Dame cathedral in Paris. Soon thereafter he was also appointed Organist of the Cavaillé-Coll great organ of the Cathedral in Nancy. After teaching at the Angers Conservatory for 10 years, he is now Professor of Organ at the Conservatory and at the Superior Music Academy in Strasbourg.

Performances 
Vexo has performed extensively throughout Europe, the United States, Canada, Australia, New Zealand and Russia. He has appeared as a featured artist in numerous international music festivals and organ series in cities such as Atlanta, Auckland, Dallas, Düsseldorf, Los Angeles, Melbourne, Montreal, Moscow, New York, Porto, Riga and Vienna. His performances have also included notable venues such as the Basilica of the National Shrine in Washington DC, the Wanamaker Grand Court in Philadelphia, the KKL in Lucerne, the St. Mary’s Cathedral in Sydney and the Yekaterinburg Philharmonic Hall.

He has also performed with various orchestras and musical ensembles. He has recorded several CDs on historical French organs, especially one for JAV recordings on the great organ of Notre Dame Cathedral in Paris. Vexo is represented by Phillip Truckenbrod Concert Artists, LLC.

Discography 
 Works by Liszt, Franck, Vierne, Duruflé, Escaich on the great organ of Notre-Dame de Paris, JAV recordings, Washington DC, 2010
 Works by Bach, Clérambault, Couperin, Grigny, Guilain, Marchand, Séjan on the historical organ of Vézelise (France), Amis de l'orgue de Vézelise, 2007
 Works by Mendelssohn, Brahms, Schumann, Liszt on the historical organ of Réchésy (France), Festival de Masevaux, 2005

References

External links 
 (en) Biography on the website of Phillip Truckenbrod Concert Artists
 (en) Biography on the website of Nancy Cathedral great organ
 Johann Vexo plays Vierne, Allegro of the 2nd Symphony on the great organ of Notre-Dame de Paris [video]
 Johann Vexo plays Bach, Allegro of the 3rd Trio sonata on the choir organ of Notre-Dame de Paris [video]
 Johann Vexo plays Widor, Toccata of the 5th Symphony on the great organ of Nancy's cathedral [video]
 Johann Vexo plays Duruflé, Prelude and fugue on Alain on the organ of Bryn Mawr Presbyterian Church (PA) [vidéo]
 Johann Vexo plays Bach, Prelude and fugue in A minor on the organ of the Episcopal Church of the Transfiguration in Dallas (TX) [vidéo]
 Johann Vexo plays Saint-Saëns, Danse macabre on the organ of the First Presbyterian Church in Philadelphia (PA) [vidéo]
 Johann Vexo plays Franck, 3rd Chorale on the organ of the Brick Presbyterian Church in New York (NY) [vidéo]

French classical organists
French male organists
Cathedral organists
French musicians
Conservatoire de Paris alumni
1978 births
Living people
Musicians from Nancy, France
21st-century organists
21st-century French male musicians
Male classical organists